Dothard v. Rawlinson, 433 U.S. 321 (1977), was the first United States Supreme Court case in which the bona fide occupational qualifications (BFOQ) defense was used.

Background
In 1977, there were height and weight restrictions (minimum 5’2”, 120 lbs) to be considered as an applicant for an Alabama prison guard. Such requirements ruled out Dianne Rawlinson, who brought forth a class action suit against the requirements under the disparate impact theory of Title VII. After Rawlinson filed her suit, Alabama passed a regulation requiring that guards be the same sex as the inmates. Alabama then had four all-male maximum security prisons and only one all-female prison.

The lower court sided with Rawlinson and claimed that the requirements created an arbitrary barrier to equal employment to women. The state then appealed to the Supreme Court and claimed that the sex, height, and weight requirements were valid occupational qualifications because of the nature of the job.

Judgment
The Court ruled 8-1 that the height and weight restrictions were discriminatory and that the employer had not proven that the height and weight standards were necessary for effective job performance. On the issue of whether women could fill close contact jobs in all male maximum security prisons, the Court ruled 6-3 that the BFOQ defense was legitimate in this case. The reason was that female prison guards were more vulnerable to male sexual attack than male prison guards were.

See also
US labor law

References

External links
 

United States Supreme Court cases
United States employment discrimination case law
1977 in United States case law
Legal history of Alabama
Penal system in Alabama
United States Supreme Court cases of the Burger Court
United States gender discrimination case law
United States labor case law
History of women in Alabama